Trichaetoides albifrontalis is a moth in the family Erebidae. It was described by Arnold Pagenstecher in 1885. It is found on Nias in Indonesia.

References

Moths described in 1885
Syntomini